Harold Tompkins was an American politician who was a member of the Massachusetts House of Representatives from 1943 to 1949 and again from 1953 to 1954.

Early life
Tompkins was born on August 23, 1887 in Adamsville, Rhode Island. He grew up in Concord, Massachusetts and attended public school there.

Outside of politics, Tompkins was an award-winning poultry farmer who bred Rhode Island Reds.

Political career
Tompkins was a member of the Concord school committee for 21 years. From 1940 to 1947 he was chairman of the board. In 1942 he was elected to the Massachusetts House of Representatives. He did not run for reelection in 1950 and was succeeded by David B. Williams. In 1953, Williams was appointed to the Massachusetts Governor's Council and Tompkins won the special election to succeed him. Tompkins did not finish the term, as he died suddenly on May 25, 1954 at his home in Concord.

See also
 Massachusetts legislature: 1943–1944, 1945–1946, 1947–1948, 1949–1950

References

1887 births
1954 deaths
20th-century American politicians
Farmers from Massachusetts
Republican Party members of the Massachusetts House of Representatives
People from Concord, Massachusetts